Daniel West or Dan West may refer to:

People
Daniel Granville West, Baron Granville-West (1904–1984), British Labour politician
Dan West (philanthropist) (1893–1971), founder of Heifer International
Dan West (athlete) (born 1977), British paralympian athlete
Dan West (Canadian football) (born 1986)
Dan West (musician), American rock and jazz musician

Fictional character
Daniel West (character), enemy of the Flash in DC Comics